Suzee Ikeda is an American singer who was the first Asian-American solo artist at Motown.  However, she is best known for her work "behind the scenes" at Motown with such acts as Michael Jackson and The Temptations.

Biography

Born Susan Wendy Ikeda on August 25, 1947, in Chicago, Illinois, the daughter of a Japanese father and an American mother.

Initially assigned to Mowest, Motown's subsidiary label, her first single was a cover version of "Zip-A-Dee-Doo-Dah" from the Disney film, Song of the South. The single failed to chart.

In April 1973, Suzee released her first single on the Motown label, a ballad written by Charles Fox and Norman Gimbel called, "Time For Me to Go."  Unfortunately, the single and her solo career went nowhere.

During her tenure at Motown she was described as a "creative confidant" of Michael Jackson. “Michael Jackson could make you forget he was so young,” writes Suzee Ikeda, in her introductory essay to Hello World: The Complete Motown Solo Collection.

Ikeda's rapport with artists soon led to a new role behind the scenes as a production executive for the company. One of her early projects was the A Song for You album by The Temptations, released in 1975.

In 1983, Ikeda became one of  the principal players in Super Three, a division of Motown responsible for developing new and existing acts.  Other participants in the partnership were off again-on again Motown figure Ray Singleton and Guy Costa (nephew of musician and arranger Don Costa), the latter who served as the entity's creative director.

Selected credits

Singles

As a recording artist

Albums

Serving in various capacities

External links
[ All Music Guide]
First Universal Network

References

1947 births
Living people
American women pop singers
Motown artists
Singers from Chicago
American musicians of Japanese descent
21st-century American women